Carolina Agüero is an Argentinian ballerina, and a principal dancer with Hamburg Ballet in Hamburg, Germany.

Early life
Carolina Agüero was born in 1975 in Córdoba, Argentina. She started Argentinian folkloric dancing classes at the age of three, and ballet when she was six years old and studied other  dance styles including classical, Spanish, tap and jazz.  At 13, she chose to focus on classical ballet.

Career
She trained at the Escuela de Ballet del Teatro Rivera Indarte. As a professional ballerina, she has been a member of the ballet companies of Ballet of Córdoba, the Ballet Argentino, the Ballet of Santiago de Chile and, in Europe, the Stuttgart Ballet, Dresden Semperoper Ballett, the Finnish National Ballet, and finally the Hamburg Ballet, as soloist in 2006 and as first soloist since 2007.

Agüero also teaches ballet techniques, and has taught Argentine tango in New York City, and classical ballet in Argentina.

Awards
Agüero won the Edvard Fazer Prize in Finland in 2004, and the Konex Prize, in Argentina, in 2009.

Personal life
She is married, with a daughter.

References

Living people
Argentine ballerinas
1975 births